Aubuchon is a surname. Notable people with the name include:

 Chet Aubuchon (1916–2005), American basketball player
 Gary Aubuchon (born 1962), American real estate broker and Republican politician
 Jacques Aubuchon (1924–1991), American actor who appeared in films, stage, and on television in the 1950s, 1960s, 1970s, and 1980s.
 Oscar Aubuchon (1917–1970), Canadian ice hockey left winger
 Remi Aubuchon, American television writer and producer

See also
 Aubuchon Hardware, hardware store chain in the northeastern United States